New Baltimore is an unincorporated community in Stark County, in the U.S. state of Ohio.

History
New Baltimore was platted in 1831. A post office called New Baltimore was established in 1837, and remained in operation until 1904.

References

Unincorporated communities in Stark County, Ohio
Unincorporated communities in Ohio